The Dez Dam, formerly known as Mohammad-Reza Shah Pahlavi Dam before 1979 Revolution, is an arch dam on the Dez River in the southwestern province of Khuzestan, Iran. It is about 23 km of Andimeshk city. It was built between 1959 and 1963 under the rule of Mohammad Reza Pahlavi, the last Shah of Iran, with contacting an Italian consortium and is owned by the Khuzestan Water & Power Authority. At the time of construction the Dez Dam was Iran's biggest development project. The primary purpose of the dam is hydroelectric power production and irrigation. US$42 million of the cost to construct the dam came from the World Bank.

Background
Impregilo was involved with building the Dez Dam. Plans for the dam were finalized in 1957 and construction began in 1959. In 1962 the first generator was commissioned. In 1963 the dam was complete with two of the eight 65 MW Francis turbine generators commissioned. The remaining six were commissioned by 1970. In the late 1970s the irrigation of the project had reached  of its  goal.

The dam's current problem is the annual loss of reservoir capacity due to the erosion of soil in upstream areas. By 2006, the reservoir volume was estimated to be

References

External links

Hydroelectric power stations in Iran
Reservoirs in Iran
Buildings and structures in Khuzestan Province
Dams in Khuzestan Province
Dams completed in 1963
Dams in the Tigris–Euphrates river system
1963 establishments in Iran
Energy infrastructure completed in 1963